Tomasz "Tomek" Bagiński (born 10 January 1976 in Białystok) is a Polish illustrator, animator, producer and director. He is a self-taught artist.

Education
Bagiński studied architecture at the Warsaw University of Technology.

Works
His first film Rain has won several local awards and became the passport to Platige Image company, in which he is a creative director. Between 1999 and 2002 he was working on his short film debut,The Cathedral, which in 2002 won the first prize at SIGGRAPH, the biggest festival of animation and special effects, and a year later was nominated for the Academy Award for Best Animated Short Film.

In 2004, he made his second short film, Fallen Art. In 2005, he received another award at the SIGGRAPH festival, becoming the only artist in history who has won two main awards. Fallen Art also received a BAFTA Award for Best Short Animation and a Grand Prix for Digital Shorts at Golden Horse Film Festival 2005 (shared with Jarek Sawko and Piotr Sikora) as well as Prix Ars Electronica.

He is the author of all covers of Jacek Dukaj books, including the novel entitled Ice.

In 2009, he directed another short film, The Kinematograph, based on a comic book by Mateusz Skutnik from the album Revolutions: Monochrome. Apart from his own projects, Bagiński works as a director on commercials and stage shows. He has published in many trade magazines, from the United States to China and Japan.

Bagiński has also created cinematics for The Witcher computer game based on the books by Andrzej Sapkowski and co-produces the Witcher Netflix series.

He is represented by UTA.

Films
Rain (1998)
The Cathedral (2002)
Fallen Art (2004)
The Witcher (game intro and outro) (2007)
Seven Gates of Jerusalem (2009)
The Kinematograph (2010)
The Animated History of Poland (2010)
Move Your Imagination - EURO 2012 UEFA (2011)
The Witcher 2 (game intro) (2011)
The Witcher 3 (game intro) (2015)
Hardkor 44
Cyberpunk 2077 (teaser trailer) (2013) 
Ambition (2014)
 2015: Polish Legends: The Dragon
 2015: Polish Legends: Twardowsky
 2016: Polish Legends: Twardowsky 2.0
 2016: Polish Legends: Operation Basilisk
 2016: Polish Legends: Jaga
 2017: The Unconquered
 2019: The Witcher (executive producer)
 2020: Into the Night (executive producer)
 2023: Knights of the Zodiac

References

External links

Bagiński's profile (in Polish)
Tomasz Bagiński at culture.pl

Polish animators
Polish artists
Polish illustrators
Polish film directors
Polish animated film directors
BAFTA winners (people)
1976 births
Living people
People from Białystok